Paul James Hanly Jr. (April 18, 1951 – May 22, 2021) was an American lawyer.

Early life and education
Hanley was born in Jersey City on April 18, 1951. His father was a hospital administrator and his mother was a homemaker. His grandfather, John V. Kenny, was a mayor of Jersey City.

Hanley attended Cornell University and graduated with a Bachelor of Arts degree in philosophy 1974. Later, he got a Master of Arts from Cambridge University in 1976 and a Juris Doctor from Georgetown University in 1979. He clerked for Lawrence Aloysius Whipple in New Jersey after graduation.

Career
Hanley started his career as a trial counsel for Turner & Newall.

In 2022, Hanley founded a law firm, Hanly Conroy with Jayne Conroy. Later, he became a partner of a law firm, Hanly Conroy Bierstein Sheridan Fisher & Hayes.

Hanley was a lead counsel of a major litigation against opioid-related companies. In another case, the victims of sexual assault at a church-run school in Haiti were represented by Hanley in their successful 2019 settlement claim for $60 million.

References

1951 births
2021 deaths
21st-century American lawyers
Cornell University alumni